Ralph Alexander Leigh  (6 January 1915 – 22 December 1987) was a modern languages scholar, Fellow of Trinity College, Cambridge, and Professor of French in the University of Cambridge from 1973 to 1982, later Sandars Reader in Bibliography, in 1986–87. He specialized in the work of Jean-Jacques Rousseau.

Educated at Raine's School for Boys in Bethnal Green, Queen Mary College, London, and the University of Paris (Sorbonne), he served in the British Army during the Second World War from 1941, was commissioned as a Lieutenant in 1942, promoted Major, 1944, and returned to civilian life in 1946, when he was appointed a lecturer in the Department of French at the University of Edinburgh. In 1967 he took up a Fulbright Scholarship at Princeton. From 1969 to 1973 he was a Reader and Senior Research Fellow in the University of Cambridge, and in 1973 a Visiting Professor at the Sorbonne.

Between 1965 and 1987 he edited more than forty volumes of the correspondence of Jean Jacques Rousseau, a work still in progress at his death.

Leigh was a Leverhulme Fellow in 1959–1960, 1970, and 1982–1983. In 1978 he gave a Taylorian Lecture on 'Rousseau and the Problem of Tolerance in the Eighteenth Century'.

In 1945, Leigh married Edith Helen Kern, who died in 1972. They had one son and one daughter.

Honours
Litt. D. (Cambridge) 1968
Fellow of the British Academy, 1969
Commander of the Order of the British Empire, 1977
Hon. Doctor, University of Neuchâtel, 1978
Médaille d'argent de la Ville de Paris, 1978
Chevalier de la Légion d'Honneur, 1979
Hon. Doctor, University of Geneva, 1983
D. Univ. Edinburgh, 1986

Major publications
Correspondance Complète de Jean Jacques Rousseau, vols. I-XLVI, 1965 to 1987
Rousseau and the Problem of Tolerance in the Rousseau and the Problem of Tolerance in the Eighteenth Century, (Taylorian Lecture for 1978), 1979
Rousseau after 200 years (ed.), 1982

Contributor to Modern Language Review, French Studies, 
Revue de littérature comparée, Annales Rousseau, Revue d'Histoire littéraire, Studies on Voltaire and other journals.

Notes

1915 births
1987 deaths
Fellows of Trinity College, Cambridge
British Army personnel of World War II
Chevaliers of the Légion d'honneur
Commanders of the Order of the British Empire
Alumni of Queen Mary University of London
University of Paris alumni
Academics of the University of Edinburgh
Fellows of the British Academy
People educated at Raine's Foundation School